Unkel is a town in the district of Neuwied, in Rhineland-Palatinate, Germany. It is situated on the right bank of the Rhine, near Remagen, about 20 km southeast of Bonn.

Unkel is the seat of the Verbandsgemeinde ("collective municipality") Unkel.

Religion 

Unkel is mainly Roman Catholic. Approximately 55% of the inhabitants are Roman Catholic, and 15% Protestant. 18% of the residents do not belong to a religious denomination, 8% are Muslim.

Geography

Location 

The town is located at the edge of the Rhine-Westerwald Nature Park in the middle of the Rhine Valley, its centre is about 4 km away from the border to North Rhine-Westphalia.

Neighbouring settlements 

Unkel is surrounded from north to south by the settlements of Rheinbreitbach, Bruchhausen, Windhagen, Linz, Erpel, and Remagen.

Subdivisions 

Unkel has three subdistricts: Unkel, Scheuren and Heister.

Sights

The most important sight is the "Freiligrathaus", which is located at the Rhine promenade. It is a baroque palace, built in  1760. Ferdinand Freiligrath lived there from 1839 until 1841.

The rich-featured Catholic parish church "St. Pantaleon" accommodates a feretory (a receptacle for the relics of saints).
Additionally, most of the old town wall is well preserved.

Twin town
  Kamen, Germany
  Ushuaia, Argentina

Famous townsfolk 

 Stefan Andres, author of the novella Wir sind Utopia.
 Konrad Adenauer (1876–1967), who became first Chancellor of West Germany, found refuge in Unkel during the time of national socialism.
 Willy Brandt (1913–1992), former Chancellor of Germany, spent the last years of his life, from 1979 until 1992, in Unkel. Many famous politicians visited him there, like Helmut Kohl and Mikhail Gorbachev. The market place is named after him. His work room can be visited on request.
 Stephan Fahrig (1968–2017), lightweight rower and a sports scientist
 Ferdinand Freiligrath (1810–1876), a German writer, started his literary career in Unkel. The house he lived in is now called Freiligrathhaus.
 Fritz Henkel (1875–1930), son of Friedrich Karl Henkel (1848–1930), the inventor of Persil (laundry detergent) and founder of the Henkel Company, had his summer home in Unkel. He donated a fire-brigade car and a park, which was named after him.
 Leonhard Reinirkens, a writer, is honorary citizen of Unkel.
 Anne Bierwirth, contralto, was born here.

References



Populated places on the Rhine
Neuwied (district)